USS LST-662 was an  built for the United States Navy in World War II. Like most ships of her class, she was not named and properly known only by her designation.

During World War II, LST-662 was assigned to the Asiatic-Pacific theater and participated in the following operations:
 
 Battle of Peleliu, September and October 1944
 Zambales-Subic Bay, January 1945
 Battle of Okinawa, April 1945
 
Following the war, LST-662 was decommissioned on 19 December 1945 and struck from the Navy List on 8 January 1946. On 25 June 1946, the ship was sold to Arctic Circle Exploration, Inc., of Seattle, Washington.
 
LST-662 earned three battle stars for World War II service.

Photo gallery

References

External links
LST 662 Memorial Website

LST-542-class tank landing ships
World War II amphibious warfare vessels of the United States
Ships built in Ambridge, Pennsylvania
1944 ships